A. H. F. Krueger was a member of the Wisconsin State Assembly.

Biography
Krueger was born on July 21, 1823, in the Grand Duchy of Mecklenburg-Schwerin. He was a miller by trade.

Assembly career
Krueger was a member of the Assembly during the 1880 and 1882 sessions. He was a Democrat.

References

People from the Grand Duchy of Mecklenburg-Schwerin
Democratic Party members of the Wisconsin State Assembly
Millers
1823 births
Year of death missing